Marescot Point is a small but distinctive low rocky point projecting north from Trinity Peninsula, Antarctica,  east of Thanaron Point. This feature is a reidentification of Captain Jules Dumont d'Urville's original "Cap Marescot," named after Jacques Marescot du Thilleul (1808–39), an ensign on the Astrolabe during d'Urville's expedition (1837–40), who died during the voyage.

Map
 Trinity Peninsula. Scale 1:250000 topographic map No. 5697. Institut für Angewandte Geodäsie and British Antarctic Survey, 1996.

References

Headlands of Trinity Peninsula